Beştalı (also, Beshtali) is a village and municipality in the Salyan Rayon of Azerbaijan.  It has a population of 520.

Notable natives 

 Maharram Dadashov — Hero of the Soviet Union.

References 

Populated places in Salyan District (Azerbaijan)